Steven Lubin (born 1942 in Brooklyn) is an American pianist and musical scholar.  He is best known for his performances on the fortepiano, the early version of the piano.

Studies

Lubin  studied piano with Lisa Grad, Nadia Reisenberg, Seymour Lipkin, Rosina Lhévinne and Beveridge Webster, and viola with Florence Nicolaides.  He attended  New York's Music & Art High School; graduated from Harvard College, majoring in philosophy; he earned a master's degree in piano at the Juilliard School; and he completed his Ph.D. in musicology at New York University, where he wrote a dissertation entitled "Techniques for the Analysis of Development in Middle-Period Beethoven."

Period performance

A subspecialty of Lubin's is his approach to performing the keyboard works of the Viennese Classical composers (Mozart, Haydn, Beethoven and Schubert) on replicas of the historic instruments actually used by the composers.  Such instruments are often generically called fortepianos.  In the 1960s, Lubin frequented the New Hampshire workshop of Philip Belt, a pioneering American builder of fortepiano replicas, and became curious how Mozart's piano concertos would have sounded on these instruments in their original performances.  In the mid 70's, he built a fortepiano replica of his own, with the help of a piano technician friend, Lee Morton, who had served as Belt's apprentice.  At his debut recital at Carnegie Recital Hall in 1977, Lubin performed Mozart works on his fortepiano, along with a large-scale Chopin work on the modern grand.  (More recently, he uses instruments by expert builders, particularly those of Rodney Regier of Freeport, ME.)

Subsequently, he organized a period-instrument Mozart orchestra, The Mozartean Players, and presented, throughout the 80's, a series of period performances of Mozart piano concertos in major New York halls.  At these performances Lubin conducted and played the solo parts.  The Arabesque label recorded a series these works, and a new release from among the performances of this era has appeared in 2006 on the Classical Soundings label.

Lubin has made concert tours in North America, Europe and Australia.

Recordings

As a recording artist Lubin has made 20 CDs for Decca, Harmonia Mundi USA, Arabesque and Classical Soundings.

In 1987, Decca Records in London engaged Lubin to record and perform the cycle of Beethoven piano concertos on period instruments, in collaboration with The Academy of Ancient Music directed by Christopher Hogwood.  These recordings have been reissued by Decca in 2006.  In addition to other recordings for Decca, Lubin has made CDs for Harmonia Mundi USA of the complete trios and piano quartets of Mozart, and of Schubert's trios.  These recordings were issued by The Mozartean Players in trio format, where Lubin was joined by Stanley Ritchie, violin, and Myron Lutzke, cello.  Anca Nicolau is currently the violinist of the trio.

On the modern piano in recent years Lubin has appeared both as a solo recitalist and concerto soloist.

Writings

Lubin writes frequently on musical subjects.  In his Ph.D. dissertation (1974), he pointed out that (1) a fruitful way of understanding 18th-century European music follows from the recognition that the composers of that era inhabited a special, abstract, communally shared harmonic space (nowadays sometimes called modulatory space) that existed independently of individual works; (2) that the internal features of this space underwent evolutionary change in the course of the 18th century; (3) that a graphic depiction of this space could be used as a map to trace the various routes composers used to navigate about in their cosmos, and that their designs for these routes constitute an important aspect of the effect and beauty of their large-scale works; and (4) that in the later 18th century, for reasons arising out of the geometry of key-relations employed by composers, their abstract background space took the form of a torus (donut).  A fertile sub-field of music theory has recently elaborated a complex of ideas related to these.  Among the leading American proponents acknowledging Lubin's contribution in this area are Richard Cohn, Fred Lerdahl and Edward Gollin.

Teaching

Lubin has taught at the Juilliard School, Vassar College, Cornell University (where he was head of the theory program) and at Purchase College SUNY), where he is currently a distinguished professor.

References

External links
Steven Lubin's webpage
The Mozartean Players' webpage
Classical Soundings' webpage

American classical pianists
Male classical pianists
American male pianists
Jewish classical pianists
Jewish American classical musicians
Fortepianists
Cornell University faculty
Juilliard School faculty
Vassar College faculty
Juilliard School alumni
Harvard College alumni
New York University alumni
The High School of Music & Art alumni
Musicians from New York City
1942 births
Living people
20th-century American pianists
Classical musicians from New York (state)
21st-century classical pianists
20th-century American male musicians
21st-century American male musicians
21st-century American pianists
21st-century American Jews